Peter Kormann (born June 21, 1955) is an American retired gymnast and gymnastics coach. In the 1976 Olympics, he became the first American to medal in competition against the Soviets when he won a bronze medal in the men's floor competition. Kormann's bronze medal was also the first Olympic medal of any type won by an American gymnast in 44 years.

Kormann competed for Southern Connecticut State University under coach Abie Grossfeld.  In 1977, Kormann won the Nissen Award (the "Heisman" of men's gymnastics). Peter went on to coach at the United States Naval Academy, the Ohio State University and was named head coach of the USA men's team from 1996 to 2001.

Kormann currently owns Yellow Jackets Gymnastics with his two sons in Massachusetts.

References

1955 births
Living people
American male artistic gymnasts
Olympic bronze medalists for the United States in gymnastics
Gymnasts at the 1976 Summer Olympics
Sportspeople from Braintree, Massachusetts
Medalists at the 1976 Summer Olympics
Pan American Games medalists in gymnastics
Pan American Games gold medalists for the United States
Gymnasts at the 1975 Pan American Games
Braintree High School alumni
Medalists at the 1975 Pan American Games
20th-century American people
21st-century American people